Julia Petryce Campbell (born 1 April 1965) is a former New Zealand association football player who represented her country.

Campbell made her Football Ferns debut in a 3–0 win over a Hawaii XI on 12 December 1987 and ended her international career with 29 caps and 3 goals to her credit.

Campbell represented New Zealand at the Women's World Cup finals in China in 1991 playing all 3 group games; a 0–3 loss to Denmark, a 0–4 loss to Norway and a 1–4 loss to China.

References

External links

1965 births
Living people
New Zealand women's international footballers
New Zealand women's association footballers
1991 FIFA Women's World Cup players
Women's association football midfielders